This article details the 2010–11 UEFA Europa League group stage.

The group stage featured 48 teams: the title holders, Atlético Madrid, the 37 winners of the play-off round, and the 10 losing teams from the Champions League play-off round

The teams were drawn into twelve groups of four, and played each other home-and-away in a round-robin format. The matchdays were 16 September, 30 September, 21 October, 4 November, 1–2 December, and 15–16 December 2010.

The top two teams in each group advanced to the round of 32, where they were joined by the eight third-placed teams from the 2010–11 UEFA Champions League group stage.

Seeding
The draw for the group stage was held in Monaco on 27 August 2010 at 1:00pm CEST (UTC+2).

Teams were seeded into four pots based on their 2010 UEFA club coefficients. The title holders, Atlético Madrid, were automatically seeded into Pot 1. Teams from the same national association could not be drawn against each other. Pot 1 held teams ranked 4–39, Pot 2 held teams ranked 40–69, Pot 3 held teams ranked 74–127, while Pot 4 held teams ranked 130–217 and unranked teams.

th Title Holder

CL-c Losing teams from the Champions League play-off round (Champions Path)

CL-n Losing teams from the Champions League play-off round (Non-Champions Path)

On the first four matchdays, when matches were played only on Thursdays, six groups played their matches at 19:00 CET/CEST, while the other six groups played their matches at 21:05 CET/CEST, with the two sets of groups (A–F, G–L) alternating between each matchday. On the final two matchdays, when matches were played on both Wednesdays and Thursdays, the two sets of groups were divided into four smaller subsets (A–C, D–F, G–I, J–L), with each subset of groups playing on a different day and time. Based on this principle, the draw was controlled for clubs from the same association in order to split the teams evenly. For example, if there were two teams from the same association, each team was drawn into a different set of groups (A–F, G–L); if there were four teams from the same association, each team was drawn into a different subset of groups (A–C, D–F, G–I, J–L).

The fixtures were decided after the draw. There were certain restrictions, e.g., teams from the same city do not play at home on the same matchday (UEFA tries to avoid teams from the same city play at home on the same day or on consecutive days), and Russian teams do not play at home on the last matchday due to cold weather.

Tie-breaking criteria
If two or more teams were equal on points on completion of the group matches, the following criteria applied to determine the rankings:
higher number of points obtained in the group matches played among the teams in question;
superior goal difference from the group matches played among the teams in question;
higher number of goals scored away from home in the group matches played among the teams in question;
superior goal difference from all group matches played;
higher number of goals scored;
higher number of coefficient points accumulated by the club in question, as well as its association, over the previous five seasons.

Groups
Times up to end of October are CEST (UTC+2), thereafter times are CET (UTC+1)

Group A

Group B

Group C

Group D

Group E 

Notes
Note 1: BATE played their group matches in Minsk at Dinamo Stadium as BATE's Haradski Stadium did not meet UEFA criteria.

Group F

Group G

Group H

Group I

Notes
Note 2: Debrecen played their group matches in Budapest at Ferenc Puskás Stadium as Debrecen's Stadion Oláh Gábor Út did not meet UEFA criteria.

Group J

Group K

Group L 

Notes
Note 3: Rapid Wien played their home group matches at Ernst-Happel-Stadion as it has a greater capacity than their Gerhard Hanappi Stadium.
Note 4: CSKA Sofia played their group matches in Sofia at Vasil Levski National Stadium as CSKA Sofia's Balgarska Armiya Stadium was closed at the end of the previous season because it didn't meet the BFU and UEFA criteria.

References

External links
2010–11 UEFA Europa League, UEFA.com

Group stage
2010-11